Chase Woodlands is a nature reserve located in Dover, Massachusetts.  The property was acquired by The Trustees of Reservations in 1993.  The reservation includes 2.5 miles of trails and is located across Farm Street from the Peters Reservation. The Charles River Link Trail crosses both reservations.

References

External links 
 The Trustees of Reservations: Chase Woodlands
 Chase Woodlands and Peters Reservation trail map

The Trustees of Reservations
Protected areas of Norfolk County, Massachusetts
Open space reserves of Massachusetts
1993 establishments in Massachusetts
Protected areas established in 1993